Andrew Dean Litinsky (born June 11, 1981), better known as Andy Dean, is an American nationally syndicated radio talk show host, political commentator, and media executive. Litinsky is the co-founder of ZideLitinsky Media with Billion Dollar Box Office producer Warren Zide, producer of film franchises including American Pie and Final Destination. 

His nationally syndicated radio show, America Now with Andy Dean, discussed politics, business, entertainment, and technology. It aired weekdays from 6pm to 9pm EDT. The program aired nationally in Premiere Radio Networks syndicated 'Big 4' lineup with Glenn Beck, Rush Limbaugh, and Sean Hannity. Prior to his nationally syndicated show, The Andy Dean Program was broadcast on WSB in Atlanta, Georgia.  While at WSB, Dean was one of the most frequently used guest hosts, and one of the most popular guest hosts, of the Herman Cain radio program, and served as a fill in host for national radio show host, Neal Boortz.

Litinsky was one of the youngest candidates to compete on NBC's The Apprentice and holds the title as the only candidate to be re-hired by Donald Trump to run his production company Trump Productions LLC.

Education
Litinsky graduated from Pine Crest School in Fort Lauderdale, Florida in 2000; while in high school he placed first in the U.S. National Debate Championships in Extemporaneous Commentary Speaking. In 2004, he graduated with honors from Harvard University with a degree in Government. While attending Harvard, Litinsky worked for Rick Davis, former political advisor to Senator John McCain.

America Now
While host of America Now, Litinsky appeared on NBC's The Today Show, CNBC's Power Lunch, Fox News' America’s News HQ and HBO's Real Time with Bill Maher.

References

External links
Andy Dean bio Premiere Speakers.

American political commentators
American talk radio hosts
Harvard College alumni
Living people
Participants in American reality television series
People from Boynton Beach, Florida
1981 births
The Apprentice (franchise) contestants
Pine Crest School alumni